Nothing's Going to Happen is the sixth full-length album released by indie rock band Elf Power.  It is a combination of previously unrecorded cover songs from a variety of the band's favorite artists, from T. Rex to The Flaming Lips, as well as a reissue of their EP Come On.

Track listing
"Nothing's Going to Happen" (Tall Dwarfs)
"Why Can't I Touch It" (Buzzcocks)
"Shadows in Vain" (Tubeway Army)
"Weird on the Avenue" (The Frogs (band))
"Pay to Cum" (Bad Brains)
"Hybrid Moments" (Misfits)
"Never Talking to You Again" (Hüsker Dü)
"I Walked With the Zombie" (Roky Erickson)
"Unforced Peace" (Roky Erickson)
"I Love the Living You" (Roky Erickson)
"Upside Down" (Jesus and Mary Chain)
"Hot Love" (Marc Bolan/T. Rex)
"Cotton Crown" (Sonic Youth)
"You Make Me Die" (Billy Childish)
"Felt Good to Burn" (Flaming Lips)
"Listening to the Higsons" (Robyn Hitchcock)

References

Elf Power albums
2002 albums
Orange Twin Records albums